Minnesota State Highway 275 (MN 275) was a  highway in southwest Minnesota, which ran from its intersection with Lac qui Parle County State-Aid Highway 2 in Boyd and continued north to its northern terminus at its intersection with U.S. Highway 212 in Baxter Township, 6 miles east of Dawson. It is now marked as Lac qui Parle County State-Aid Highway 29, and Lac qui Parle County Road 208 in the city limits of Boyd.

Route description
Highway 275 served as a north–south connector route in southwest Minnesota between the town of Boyd and U.S. Highway 212.

Highway 275 followed 3rd Street in the town of Boyd.

The route was legally defined as Route 275 in the Minnesota Statutes.

History
Highway 275 was authorized on July 1, 1949.

The route was paved in 1954 or 1955.

Highway 275 was removed from statute in 2015 and given to Lac qui Parle County in 2017 as part of a road exchange, which transferred Lac qui Parle County State-Aid Highway 25 between Highway 40 and US 212 to the state as an extension of Minnesota State Highway 119.

Major intersections

References

External links

Highway 275 at the Unofficial Minnesota Highways Page

275
Transportation in Lac qui Parle County, Minnesota